Princess sickness, alternatively known as princess complex, princess syndrome or princess disease (Vietnamese: bệnh công chúa; ; ; Revised Romanization: gong ju byeong), is a neologism used colloquially in East and Southeast Asia to describe a condition of narcissism and materialism in women, or "princess" behaviour. Conversely but less commonly, men with a similar outlook may be described as having "prince" sickness.

It is speculated that the term originated with the rise of the Four Asian Tigers across Asia, in which rapid economic growth may have contributed to a corresponding rise in consumerist or materialistic attitudes and upper classes investing heavily in their children, who might subsequently become accustomed to material wealth and domestic help.

Causes
In Mainland China, Hong Kong,  Macau and Taiwan, low birth rates have meant that families often have only children that are the sole focus of their parents' energies. In Mainland China, the resultant phenomenon, often attributed to the former one-child policy, is known as the 'Little Emperor Syndrome'. A combination of helicopter parenting and presence of domestic workers, allowing middle-class parents to work, can contribute to their children being spoilt. A widening income gap in Hong Kong, along with concerns over democracy and social inequality, also reflects the perceived attitudes of the 'elite' classes.

Furthermore, social mobility in East Asia is primarily based on personal and academic achievement. For that reason, parents may place a great deal of academic pressure on both children and their teachers, micro-managing their child's academic career to achieve higher grades. Some suggest that this results in dependence or a lack of responsibility.

In popular culture
 "Princess Syndrome" (Gōng Zhǔ Bìng 公主病) – a song by Taiwanese singer Jay Chou in the album Exclamation Mark.
 "Disease Princess" – a song by Japanese musician Masa.
 "Princess Disease" – a song by British Power Electronics group Whitehouse on their album "Cruise".
 "World is Mine" – a song by software voicebank Hatsune Miku.

See also 
 Black American princess
 Cluster B personality disorders
 Gong nui
 Gynocentrism
 Jewish-American princess
 Little Emperor Syndrome

References

External links
 Peter Wright, 'Gynocentrism As A Narcissistic Pathology'

Culture-bound syndromes
Culture of Hong Kong
Culture of Macau
Chinese culture
East Asian culture
Japanese culture
Stereotypes of East Asian people
South Korean culture
Taiwanese culture